The Bennington Independent School District is a school district based in Bennington, Oklahoma, United States. It contains an elementary school and a combined middle/high school.

See also
 List of school districts in Oklahoma

References

External links
 Bennington School District
 Bennington Overview

School districts in Oklahoma
Education in Bryan County, Oklahoma